Mitch Pechet (May 7, 1918, in Cupar, Saskatchewan – September 30, 2009) was a professional National Hockey League (NHL) and United States Hockey League (USHL) right winger. At the age of 18 he was drafted into the New York Rangers, playing professionally until enlisting in the Royal Canadian Air Force in 1939. He played for 11 pro seasons.

Awards and achievements
United States Hockey League (USHL) Championship (1949)
"Honoured Member" of the Manitoba Hockey Hall of Fame

World War II service
Pechet served his country during World War II. He joined the Royal Canadian Air Force (RCAF), signing up in 1940. His wartime service lasted until May 8, 1945 (V.E.Day), and he left the Air Force as a Flight Sergeant.

Both of Pechet's brothers joined the Royal Canadian Air Force (RCAF). His oldest brother was killed on his 17th operational mission in December 1944.

References

External links

Mitch Pechet’s biography at Manitoba Hockey Hall of Fame

1918 births
2009 deaths
Canadian World War II pilots
Canadian ice hockey right wingers
Brandon Wheat Kings players
Jewish ice hockey players
New York Rovers players
Philadelphia Ramblers players
St. Paul Saints (USHL) players
Philadelphia Rockets players
New York Rangers players
Royal Canadian Air Force officers
Royal Canadian Air Force personnel of World War II
Canadian expatriate ice hockey players in the United States